AFAR is a print and digital publication focused on experiential travel and whose mission is "making travel a force for good". Based in New York and San Francisco, the team covers many topics within travel such as travel news, air travel, hotels & accommodation, outdoors, arts & culture, food & drink, road trips, family travel, cruise, train travel, and destination guides. Their articles are available on the company’s website, afar.com, and in the print magazine.

Background 
AFAR was founded by Greg Sullivan and Joseph Diaz, after the pair took a six-week trip to India. They launched AFAR as a print magazine in 2009 along with editor-in-chief Julia Cosgrove and have since grown into a critically acclaimed travel media company whose portfolio now includes AFAR magazine; afar.com; Learning AFAR, a non-profit, travel scholarship program; AFAR Experiences, an immersive travel event series; Travel Tales podcast; and AFAR Advisor, a B-to-B platform inspiring and empowering travel advisors.

Travel Tales Podcast 
AFAR Media has a travel podcast called Travel Tales, hosted by deputy editor Aislyn Greene, which launched in July 2020.

Learning AFAR 
Learning AFAR provides scholarships for educational journeys for students in collaboration with No Barriers. Learning AFAR is a travel scholarship program for students from low-income backgrounds and for those with mixed abilities. Since Learning AFAR was founded, they have sent more than 1,300 young people on transformative trips to places like Cambodia, Costa Rica, Mexico, and Peru.

Awards 
The magazine was featured on The Martha Stewart Show, and has received awards in the travel writing and journalism industry (Lowell Thomas Awards) for their photography and storytelling. AFAR.com was a Webby honoree in 2020.

Several stories from AFAR Magazine have also been included in the Best American Travel Writing series, including "Vietnam's Bowl of Secrets" by David Farley, "The Sound of Silence" by Lisa Abend, "Counter Revolution" by Anya von Bremzen, and "Out of Sight" by Ryan Knighton.

References

External links

Corporate Website

Magazines established in 2009
Magazines published in San Francisco
Tourism magazines